Caverly is an English toponymic surname associated with the village of Calverley in West Yorkshire, England. Notable people with the surname include:

 Kristen Caverly (born 1984), American swimmer
 Robert Henry Caverly, American engineer

References 

.

English toponymic surnames